Transtillaspis armifera is a species of moth of the family Tortricidae. It is found in Venezuela.

The wingspan is about 26 mm. The ground colour of the forewings is brownish, sprinkled with brownish. The markings are brown. The hindwings are cream, somewhat mixed with brownish on the periphery.

Etymology
The species name refers to the strong processes of the transtilla and is derived from Latin arma (meaning weapon) and ferre (meaning to carry).

References

Moths described in 2006
Transtillaspis
Taxa named by Józef Razowski